Unriddle (simplified Chinese: 最火搭档) is a Singaporean Chinese drama which was telecast on Singapore's free-to-air channel, MediaCorp Channel 8. It stars Rui En, Chen Liping, Tay Ping Hui, Andie Chen, Xiang Yun, Joshua Ang & Zhou Ying as the casts of the series. It made its debut on 4 August 2010. This drama serial consists of 20 episodes, and was screened on every weekday night at 9:00 pm.

A sequel, Unriddle 2, was confirmed in February 2011.

Cast

Awards and nominations

References

Singaporean television series